Senicapoc (ICA-17043) is a Gardos channel blocker.

It has been proposed for use in sickle cell anemia. Gardos channel blockers may work in the treatment of sickle cell anemia by blocking the efflux of potassium and water from red blood cells, thereby preventing the dehydration of red blood cells and stopping the polymerization of HbS. 

The Gardos channel has been identified as KCNN4.

The "ICA" is for Icagen, which is developing the drug.

References

Fluoroarenes
Acetamides